Fab Lab MSI (Fabrication Laboratory at the Museum of Science and Industry in Chicago, Illinois) is a small scale workshop that uses various machines to create both prototypes for individuals and small projects for museum members and visitors. The idea behind the Fab Lab is to be able to learn how to use various machines to build "almost anything".

The lab is located in the innovations (the ball enterprise) section of the museum, next to the Toymaker 3000 .  

This Fab Lab is part of 34 other Fab Labs found in 10 countries, all of which started in the Media Lab at MIT.  These labs are all interconnected, although the idea is for each lab to become independent yet keeping with the same concepts and ideas.  

The equipment found in the Fab Lab at MSI includes:

 Laser cutter - sheet material cutting
 Modela milling machines - 3-d milling and scanning machine
 CNC machine - computer-controlled mills, lathes, etc.
 Computer labs - computers equipped with various software for any lab project as well as conference calling
 Vinyl cutting machines - used to cut and create vinyl projects
 Electrical stations - stations with electrical equipment (anything from circuit boards, resistors and LED lights to solar panels and small LCD screens)

Illinois Tech and the Fab Lab 
In recent years the Fab Lab has been opened to members of a project group (IPRO) at Illinois Tech.  These IPRO members have been working to create both interest for the Fab Lab as well as learn how to use all of the available equipment.  The IPRO group also works with MSI in order to make this lab an integral part of the museum and to expand the imagination of both younger and older generations.  In doing this, the Illinois Tech group has created projects to showcase some abilities of the Fab Lab.
The Fab Lab has also been opened to try to show students of varying age groups the principles of prototyping.  This will hopefully open doors for other groups to use the Fab Lab in creating projects.

Previous projects 
Since the fab lab opened the IPRO group at Illinois Tech there have been various projects aimed at both having fun and educating.  These projects range from rubber band trains to crank powered "power plants" that could be used to charge up batteries and phones.  Other simple projects include movable puzzles and games.

Future projects 
Future projects have been aimed towards new and existing exhibits found at the Museum of Science and Industry. These can include miners' hats for the coal mining exhibit, periscope, models of the U-505 submarine, and stamps of various other exhibits. Other projects were also taken and expanded upon.

The idea for these projects is for members to come to the lab and create something as well as learning more about the exhibit itself. This also gives the museum members a chance to take a souvenir with them as they leave and to expand their minds on what can be built in the lab.

At the moment students who have come to the fab lab were able to print (engrave) their pictures on acrylic boards, which can be used as keychains. At some angles the engraving seems very simple, but if the light is caught at the perfect angle, the image is shown with high precision and detail.

Additional opportunities for community outreach (and robotics projects) can be found through support of  FIRST initiatives in  Illinois. FIRST inspires students ages 6–18 to explore science, technology, engineering and math (STEM) through robotics projects and Gracious Professionalism. Teams also play an active role in their communities, volunteering to improve their environment beyond their robot.

Support for this Fab Lab
The Fab Lab MSI was made possible with continuing support from:
National Science Foundation
Department of Energy
Argonne National Laboratory
University of Chicago
Center for Bits and Atoms of the Massachusetts Institute of Technology
Illinois Institute of Technology

Museums in Chicago